Macrolopha is a genus of beetles in the family Megalopodidae, containing the following species:

 Subgenus Incisolopha Pic, 1951
 Macrolopha transversicollis Pic, 1951
 Subgenus Macrolopha Weise, 1902
 Macrolopha aeneipennis (Weise, 1915)
 Macrolopha apicata (Fairmaire, 1887)
 Macrolopha atricornis Pic, 1951
 Macrolopha bicolor (Jacoby, 1901)
 Macrolopha bicoloripennis Pic, 1951
 Macrolopha biflavomaculata Pic, 1953
 Macrolopha brunneonotata Pic, 1951
 Macrolopha carinata (Bryant, 1930)
 Macrolopha centromaculata (Jacoby, 1894)
 Macrolopha costatipennis (Pic, 1937)
 Macrolopha cribricollis Pic, 1951
 Macrolopha dentipes Weise, 1902
 Macrolopha dollmani (Bryant, 1930)
 Macrolopha flavofasciata (Pic, 1945)
 Macrolopha hargreavesi (Bryant, 1930)
 Macrolopha insignata Pic, 1951
 Macrolopha interrupta (Pic, 1947)
 Macrolopha jacobyi Weise, 1902
 Macrolopha luteofasciata Pic, 1951
 Macrolopha major Pic, 1955
 Macrolopha mashuana (Jacoby, 1895)
 Macrolopha minuta Pic, 1951
 Macrolopha murrayi (Baly, 1859)
 Macrolopha neavei (Bryant, 1930)
 Macrolopha notaticollis (Pic, 1952)
 Macrolopha nyassae (Bryant, 1930)
 Macrolopha parvula (Westwood, 1864)
 Macrolopha quadrimaculata Gahan, 1909
 Macrolopha rustica Weise, 1902
 Macrolopha subfasciata Pic, 1951
 Macrolopha suturalis (Clavareau, 1909)
 Macrolopha theresae (Pic, 1947)
 Macrolopha tricoloripes (Pic, 1927)
 Macrolopha variabilis (Westwood, 1864)

References

Megalopodidae genera
Taxa named by Julius Weise